The Sky, the Earth and the Rain is a 2008 Chilean-French-German drama film directed by José Luis Torres Leiva.

Plot 
The images of southern Chile depict a bleak rural landscape that appears to encroach upon any possibility of escape. Ana, Verónica, Marta, and Toro are four solitary individuals who endure their lives through routine and silence. They come together to share meals, walk along the beach, take a ferry, or simply keep each other company without the need for words. They seek love, intimacy, familial connections that don't exist, and spaces and time of their own, not only to escape their profound loneliness but also to discover themselves.

Cast 
 Julieta Figueroa
 Angélica Riquelme 
 Mariana Muñoz 
 Pablo Krögh 
 Ignacio Agüero 
 Maite Fernández 
 Hugo Medina 
 Chamila Rodríguez 
 Isabel Quinteros

References

External links 

2008 drama films
2008 films
Chilean drama films
French drama films
German drama films
2000s French films
2000s German films